
This is a list of named horses and the senior Union and Confederate officers who rode them during the American Civil War.

See also
 Horsemanship of Ulysses S. Grant
 War horse
 List of historical horses

References

Further reading

 Cozzens, Peter. Shenandoah 1862: Stonewall Jackson's Valley Campaign. Chapel Hill: University of North Carolina Press, 2008. .
 Magner, Blake A. Traveller & Company, The Horses of Gettysburg. Gettysburg, PA: Farnsworth House Military Impressions, 1995. .
 Wert, Jeffry D. Cavalryman of the Lost Cause: A Biography of J.E.B. Stuart. New York: Simon & Schuster, 2008. .

External links

 Ulysses S. Grant and His Horses During and After the Civil War

Horses
American Civil War
American Civil War
Horses